Over the Top is a World War I song written by Marion Phelps and composed by Maxwell Goldman. The song was first published in 1917 by Buck & Lowney in New York, NY. The sheet music features soldiers crawling from a trench and attacking.

The sheet music can be found at the Pritzker Military Museum & Library.

References 

1917 songs
Songs of World War I